The 2002 Women's Pan-American Volleyball Cup was the first edition of the annual women's volleyball tournament, played by seven countries from Wednesday June 26 to Sunday June 30, 2002 in Tijuana, Mexico. The intercontinental event served as a qualifier for the 2003 FIVB World Grand Prix.

Competing nations

Squads

Preliminary round

Group A

Wednesday June 26, 2002

Thursday June 27, 2002

Friday June 28, 2002

Group B

Wednesday June 26, 2002

Thursday June 27, 2002

Friday June 28, 2002

Final round

Saturday June 29, 2002
Classification Match

Semi-finals

Sunday June 30, 2002
Fifth Place Match

Bronze Medal Match

Gold Medal Match

Final ranking

Cuba and Dominican Republic qualified for the 2003 World Grand Prix. The Dominican Republic withdrew because of the 2003 Pan-American Games, Canada replace them.

Individual awards

Most Valuable Player

Best Spiker

Best Blocker

Best Digger

Best Receiver

Best Libero

Best Server

Best Setter

References

 results

Women's Pan-American Volleyball Cup
Pan-American Volleyball Cup
P
Volleyball
Women's Pan-American Volleyball Cup
2002 in Mexican women's sports